Abramo Canka (born Abramo Penè; 18 March 2002) is an Italian college basketball player for the UCLA Bruins of the  Pac-12 Conference.

Early life and youth career
Born in Genoa, Italy to a Senegalese father and Kosovo Albanian mother, Canka grew up playing basketball for Tigullio Sport Team Ligure. On 4 August 2016, he joined the youth academy of Serie B club Stella Azzurra Roma. Canka played for Stella Azzurra's under-18 team at Adidas Next Generation Tournament Munich in January 2020 and was named to the all-tournament team after averaging 16.8 points, 4.3 rebounds, 4.3 assists and 2.3 steals per game, leading his team to the final of the tournament.

Professional career
In the 2018–19 season, Canka began playing for Roseto Sharks of the Serie A2 Basket and was the youngest player in the league, making his debut at age 16. On 13 October 2019, he recorded a career-high 25 points, shooting 12-of-15 from the field, along with nine rebounds, five assists and five steals in a 113–112 double overtime win over JuveCaserta. In the 2019–20 season, Canka averaged 7.8 points, 4.1 rebounds, 1.8 assists and 1.6 steals per game.

On 27 June 2020, Canka moved to Lokomotiv Kuban of the VTB United League. Six days later, he was loaned to Nevėžis Kėdainiai of the Lithuanian Basketball League (LKL). Canka averaged 7.9 points, 3.7 rebounds and 1.2 steals per game. He returned to Lokomotiv Kuban on 3 December 2021.

College career
On 3 August 2022, the UCLA Bruins signed Canka as a freshman for the 2022–23 season.

National team career
Canka represented Italy at the 2018 FIBA U16 European Championship in Novi Sad, Serbia. In seven games, he averaged 10.6 points, 7.1 rebounds, two assists and 1.9 steals per game, leading his team to 12th place. He also averaged 9.4 points and 2.1 rebounds in the 2022 FIBA U20 European Championship.

References

External links
UCLA Bruins bio

Living people
2002 births
BC Nevėžis players
Italian men's basketball players
Italian people of Kosovan descent
Italian people of Albanian descent
Italian people of Senegalese descent
Italian sportspeople of African descent
PBC Lokomotiv-Kuban players
Roseto Sharks players
UCLA Bruins men's basketball players
Shooting guards
Sportspeople from Genoa